Nick Collier (born 23 September 1988), better known as Ella Vaday, is an English drag queen, actor and dancer who competed on the third series of RuPaul's Drag Race UK.

Early life and education
Collier was based in Dagenham, East London as a child. A fan of singing and dancing as a child, he attended Bird College, a performing arts school in Sidcup, South East London.

Career
Collier first worked as a backup dancer for Olly Murs and Eoghan Quigg on The X Factor. Theatre credits include Book of Mormon, Cats, Fame, Joseph and the Amazing Technicolour Dreamcoat, Peter Pan, and Wicked. He has also operated a dog walking business. Collier competed under his drag name, Ella Vaday, on the third series of RuPaul's Drag Race UK. He impersonated Nigella Lawson during the Snatch Game challenge. Conor Clark of Gay Times called the impersonation "iconic". Collier was one of the three finalists, competing against Krystal Versace and Kitty Scott-Claus in the final lip-sync to “You Don’t Own Me” by Dusty Springfield.

Collier is also due to appear as Ella Vaday in Sumotherhood, the feature film follow-up to Anuvahood by Adam Deacon, due for release in late 2022.

Personal life
During the COVID-19 pandemic, Ella Vaday's social media following increased from 6,000 to 30,000 followers.

Filmography

Television
 RuPaul's Drag Race UK (2021)

Awards and nominations

References

Living people
1988 births
20th-century English LGBT people
21st-century English LGBT people
Alumni of Bird College
English dancers
English drag queens
English gay actors
English male stage actors
People from Dagenham
RuPaul's Drag Race UK contestants